Bruno Miguel Nogueira Pinheiro (born 30 October 1976) is a Portuguese professional football manager.

He coached youth and amateur football in Portugal before moving to Qatar in 2016 and leading the nation's youth teams, including at the 2019 FIFA U-20 World Cup. In two years at Estoril, he won the Liga Portugal 2 title in 2021 and achieved ninth place in the Primeira Liga. As interim manager of the Qatar senior team in January 2023, he reached the semi-finals of the 25th Persian  Gulf Cup.

Coaching career

Early years
Born in Charneca de Caparica, Almada, Pinheiro was a youth coach at Benfica and Belenenses. From 2014, he had his first experience in the third-tier Campeonato de Portugal, at Eléctrico. From 2016, he worked in Qatar at the Aspire Academy and with the nation's youth teams. He led the under-19 team to the semi-finals of the 2018 AFC Championship, qualifying for the 2019 FIFA U-20 World Cup in Poland where they lost all three games in a group-stage exit.

Estoril
On 27 June 2020, Pinheiro was named manager of LigaPro team Estoril. His team made the Taça de Portugal semi-finals in his first season, losing 5–1 on aggregate to Benfica, and won promotion to the Primeira Liga as champions with four more points than Vizela.

Pinheiro won his first top-flight game on 6 August 2021, 2–0 at fellow promoted team Arouca. The following 1 July, having achieved ninth place, he chose to let his contract expire.

Qatar senior team
In December 2022, Pinheiro returned to Qatar to lead the senior national team on an interim basis at the 25th Arabian Gulf Cup to be held in Iraq at the start of the new year. He replaced Félix Sánchez, who was allowed to leave after the team were eliminated at the group stage of their hosting of the 2022 FIFA World Cup.

Pinheiro's team won 2–0 against Kuwait on his debut on 7 January, then lost to Bahrain and drew with the United Arab Emirates to advance as group runners-up on goal difference over the Kuwaitis. The side then lost 2–1 to the hosts at the Basra International Stadium. On 7 February, the Qatar Football Association appointed experienced compatriot Carlos Queiroz until 2026.

Managerial statistics

Honours
Estoril
Liga Portugal 2: 2020–21

References

External links
 
 

1976 births
Living people
Sportspeople from Almada
Portuguese football managers
Primeira Liga managers
Liga Portugal 2 managers
G.D. Estoril Praia managers
Qatar national football team managers
Portuguese expatriate football managers
Portuguese expatriate sportspeople in Qatar
Expatriate football managers in Qatar